The United States District Court for the Eastern District of Arkansas (in case citations, E.D. Ark.) is a federal court in the Eighth Circuit (except for patent claims and claims against the U.S. government under the Tucker Act, which are appealed to the Federal Circuit).

The District was established on March 3, 1851, with the division of the state into an Eastern and Western district.

The United States Attorney's Office for the Eastern District of Arkansas represents the United States in civil and criminal litigation in the court.  the United States Attorney is Jonathan D. Ross.

Organization of the court 
The United States District Court for the Eastern District of Arkansas is one of two federal judicial districts in Arkansas. Court for the District is held at Helena, Jonesboro, and Little Rock.

Central Division comprises the following counties: Cleburne, Cleveland, Conway, Dallas, Drew, Faulkner, Grant, Jefferson, Lincoln, Lonoke, Perry, Pope, Prairie, Pulaski, Saline, Stone, Van Buren, White, and Yell.

Delta Division comprises the following counties: Arkansas, Chicot, Crittenden, Desha, Lee, Monroe, Phillips, and St. Francis.

Northern Division comprises the following counties: Clay, Craighead, Cross, Fulton, Greene, Independence, Izard, Jackson, Lawrence, Mississippi, Poinsett, Randolph, Sharp, and Woodruff.

Current judges 
:

Former judges

Chief judges

Succession of seats

United States Attorneys 

Recent former US Attorneys for the district

 Timothy Griffin
 Bud Cummins
 Chris Thyer

See also 
 Courts of Arkansas
 List of current United States district judges
 List of United States federal courthouses in Arkansas

References

External links 
 United States District Court for the Eastern District of Arkansas
 United States Attorney for the Eastern District of Arkansas

1851 establishments in Arkansas
Arkansas law
Courts and tribunals established in 1851
Organizations based in Little Rock, Arkansas
Arkansas, Eastern District